Eila Grahame (2 October 1935 – 25 November 2009) was an English antiques dealer known for her sure eye and judgement. Her personal effects were sold at auction in 2016 with the proceeds going to the Art Fund and the church of St Mary of the Assumption at Ufford, where she is buried. In August 2017, it was reported that previously unknown sketches by Alberto Giacometti were found among the effects in Grahame's shop in Kensington Church Street.

References

1935 births
2009 deaths
Businesspeople from London
English people of Scottish descent
20th-century English businesswomen
20th-century English businesspeople
21st-century English businesswomen
21st-century English businesspeople
Antiques dealers